The Keys to the House is an Italian 2004 dramatic family film based on the story Born Twice (Italian title: Nati due volte) telling the story of a young father meeting his handicapped son for the first time and attempts to forge a relationship with the teenager. The film was directed by Gianni Amelio.

Plot

Gianni (Kim Rossi Stuart) has left his handicapped son Paolo (Andrea Rossi) in the care of others since his birth. He has not been able to cope with Paolo’s mother’s death in childbirth or that Paolo has not developed like other children because of his handicap. Paolo is now fifteen and is about to meet his father for the first time. Gianni has been asked by his son's caretakers to bring him to a Berlin hospital for yearly tests and check-ups. According to their doctor, the "shock" of meeting his father could help Paolo in his treatment. 
 
When Gianni boards the night train on which Paolo is already travelling, it is Gianni who is in for a shock. Paolo does not seem particularly impressed nor disturbed by this first meeting with his biological father. He seems more interested in his Game Boy instead. Gianni and Nicole (Charlotte Rampling) meet accidentally in the Berlin hospital and, even though he feels awkward and almost ashamed at being seen as having fathered "such a child", they connect. Nicole has spent her life caring for her daughter and could teach Gianni something if only he were willing to listen. Through a series of chance encounters aided by a book left behind by Nicole (Born Twice Italian title: Nati due volte, incidentally the book on which the film is based), they meet several times and get talking.

Awards
The film has won nine awards and fourteen nominations.

2004
In the same year of its release (2004) it won four awards and one nomination in the Venice Film Festival:

2005
In the second year (2005) it won:

One award and six nominations in the David di Donatello Awards:

Three awards and five nominations in the Italian National Syndicate of Film Journalists:

and two nominations in the Young Artist Awards:

2006
In the third year (2006) it won:

One award in the Turia Awards:

External links

2004 films
2004 drama films
Films directed by Gianni Amelio
Italian drama films
Films based on Italian novels
Films set in Berlin
Lakeshore Entertainment films